Sovetsk is the name of several urban localities in Russia.

Sovetsk, Kaliningrad Oblast, a town in Kaliningrad Oblast, formerly Tilsit
Sovetsk, Kirov Oblast, a town in Sovetsky District of Kirov Oblast; 
Sovetsk, Tula Oblast, a town in Shchyokinsky District of Tula Oblast

See also
Sovetsky (disambiguation)
Soviet (disambiguation)